Matt Roper is a British comedian, writer and musician.

Career
Roper made his comedy debut in London during the late-1990s and is noted for his early work in sketch comedy at the Jermyn Street Theatre and in the satirical sketch show Newsrevue at the Canal Café Theatre.

He first gained prominence with his creation of Wilfredo, a grotesque satire of a Mediterranean romantic singer that has divided critics, leading them to proclaim him as "strangely endearing", "utterly charming and uplifting", "unlikeable", "inappropriate" and "a genius creation". The character  is notoriously ill-mannered; frequently salivating onstage, drinking and smoking his way throughout songs, while berating his musicians and audience members with insults and expletives.

With Wilfredo and his band, Roper toured the British summer festival circuit, counting the Glastonbury Festival among his successes on several occasions. In July 2010 Wilfredo became the surprise hit of the Port Eliot Festival, appearing onstage with Jarvis Cocker. Roper has presented the character at the Café de Paris, the Tobacco Factory in Bristol, Brighton Komedia and at London's Leicester Square Theatre. He has toured the character to festivals worldwide, giving performances in Australia, Argentina, the Philippines, the United States, South Africa, and across Europe.

In June 2011, Wilfredo appeared in the first series of Rufus Hound's What's So Funny? for BBC Radio 7 (now BBC Radio 4 Extra), recorded the Christmas Day edition of The Comedy Club Interviews for the same channel later that year in addition to making an appearance on Arthur Smith's Pissed Up Chat Show at the E4 Udderbelly at the Southbank Centre.

With comedian Pippa Evans under the guise of Loretta Maine, Roper co-wrote and recorded the song 'Happy Goddamn Christmas', released on 1 December 2012, peaking at No. 6 on the iTunes UK Comedy Charts. An accompanying video was released via BBC Three featuring cameos by Arthur Smith, Imran Yusuf, Ruth Bratt and Thom Tuck. Also with Evans, he co-wrote and recorded the single 'Peace All Over The World (At Christmas Time)', released 8 December 2014 and reportedly banned by BBC Radio 2 who were "worried that sensitive listeners would be offended".

Roper played both God and the Devil, in Terry Newman's political satire Lucifer: My Part in the New Labour Project (And How I Invented Coalition Government) in London and for the Brighton Festival in May 2011.

In September 2014, he joined the line-up of the surreal sketch comedy group The Greatest Show on Legs, debuting in Leipzig, Germany.

Edinburgh Festival Fringe
At the Edinburgh Festival Fringe, Roper has presented three feature length solo shows, Wilfredo: Erecto! (2011), The Wonderful World of Wilfredo (2012) and Wilfredo: Deconstructed (2014). Drawing positive comment and reviews in the press, Wilfredo was described by the Guardian newspaper as "weird, intimate and wonderful" and by Time Out as "an extraordinary creation who cuts a hacking, spluttering, beer dribbling figure upon the stage". The comedy industry website Chortle observed the character as "cantankerous, often lecherous and almost certainly consumptive, coughing and burping his way through the set, at one point hacking up phlegm like a horse chewing a toffee."

At the 2012 Edinburgh Festival, Roper appeared opposite Phil Nichol in a one-off performance at the Traverse Theatre for Theatre Uncut's season of radical playlets, playing an advertising executive representing a global corporation in Indulge by the Icelandic playwright Andri Snaer Magnuson.

In 2015, Roper accepted the Malcolm Hardee Award for Cunning Stunt of the Year, awarded to a group or individual annually for performing elaborate publicity stunts to promote their festival appearance. He had gained access to a social media account belonging to Kate Copstick, head comedy critic of the influential Scotsman newspaper, writing a glowing review of his own talents under her name.

New York Theatre

On 14 April 2016 it was announced that Roper was to play Chico Marx, eldest of the Marx Brothers, in I'll Say She Is: The Lost Marx Brothers Musical, opening Off-Broadway at the Connelly Theater in New York City. The show opened on 28 May 2016 to acclaim in the New York press, winning the New York Times Critic's Pick. Adam Gopnik, profiling the show in the New Yorker, writes "Matt Roper, enlisted to play Chico, had to learn how to reproduce a fiendishly singular accent—not an Italian accent but a New York Italian-émigré accent as rendered in caricature by an émigré New York Jew—as well as how to play “trick” piano, in the distinctive Chico style, with the left hand lolling and the right hand shooting the keys and kittening... he captures the strange, unearned belligerence of Chico."

On 6 December 2017 Roper opened Off-Broadway in the comic/clown role of the first large-scale pantomime to be presented in New York for over a century, at the Playhouse Theater of the Henry Street Settlement. Adapted from the fairy tale of the same title by the British actor-musician Mat Fraser and directed by the performance artist Julie Atlas Muz, Jack and the Beanstalk also starred Dirty Martini and a cast of downtown performers. The production enjoyed a revival the following year at the same theatre, running for three weeks during the 2018 holiday season.

On 19 July 2018 Roper reprised his role as Chico Marx for 13 performances at the Culbreth Theater in The Cocoanuts, an adaptation of the 1925 Broadway musical-comedy directed by and starring Frank Ferrante as Groucho.

Roper again teamed up with Ferrante for the recording of a soundtrack album to accompany the release of the graphic novel Giraffes on Horseback Salad, based on an unproduced screenplay written by Salvador Dalí for the Marx Brothers. Composed and produced by jazz multi-instrumentalist Quin Arbeitman with a score and spoken word vignettes from an ensemble of musicians and vocalists from around the world, the album was released worldwide on 26 July 2019.

Roper made his directorial debut with Ashley Blaker's stand-up comedy Goy Friendly, opening for three weeks Off-Broadway at New York's Soho Playhouse. Produced by Matt Lucas, the show opened 3 February 2020.

On 4 December 2021 Roper opened at the Playhouse Theater of the Henry Settlement in Dick Rivington and The Cat, a pantomime inspired by the British folk story of Dick Whittington, directed by Julie Atlas Muz and written by Mat Fraser. On 13 December, the production cancelled all remaining performances due to the outbreak of the Omicron variant of COVID-19 in New York City, with several members of the cast testing positive for contracting the virus.

Roper makes appearances under the guise of characters at the Slipper Room, a variety theatre in Manhattan's Lower East Side.

Politics
In November 2014, Roper was among 44 comedians to sign an open letter to Dapper Laughs published nationally in the UK's Independent newspaper, protesting "encouraging rape culture and normalising sexism" in an ITV2 series, which was subsequently cancelled. He is a member of the Save Soho movement, a collective of artists who oppose the ongoing closure and demolition of music venues and independent businesses within the London neighbourhood, adding his signature to a letter to Boris Johnson in 2014. Roper is a long-time supporter of the British Labour Party and many of its causes. He is a supporter of the British-based NGO Burma Campaign UK.

Personal life

Roper lives in Harlem, New York City. He is a son of the late British comedian George Roper. On his paternal side, Roper is a great-grandnephew of brothers Johnnie Cullen and George Sanford, two early 20th century stars of the British Music Hall stage, and a great-nephew of the BBC wartime singer Jeannie Bradbury. 

On his maternal side, Roper descends from the Groves family of actors and performers, which includes Martha Bigg (an actress of the Regency era), Fred Groves (a leading man in British silent films) and Walter Groves (a comedian with the Fred Karno Company).

The American writer Trav S.D., author of No Applause, Just Throw Money: The Book That Made Vaudeville Famous, describes the generational differences between father and son:

Discography
 Happy Goddamn Christmas - Loretta Maine feat. Matt Roper (single, 2012) 
 The Wonderful World of Wilfredo - Wilfredo (album, 2014)
 Peace All Over the World (At Christmas Time) - Wilfredo feat. the Great Carmella (single, 2014)
 Wilfredo Unchained: Live in California - Wilfredo (album, 2015)
 Giraffes on Horseback Salad (Original Soundtrack) – Quin Arbeitman (album, 2019)

References

External links
So It Goes – An Interview with Matt Roper So It Goes. John Fleming: 'The indiscreet charm of a slobbering, innocent singer at the Edinburgh Fringe'. Matt Roper Interviewed.
Matt Roper at the Huffington Post Profile.
Official Website.

Groves family
1977 births
Living people
English satirists
English male comedians